Franz Hiller (born 22 October 1950) is a German retired footballer who played for TSV 1860 Munich and Werder Bremen, as well as Elche CF in Spain. In 1983, he played for the Calgary Mustangs of the Canadian Professional Soccer League.

References

External links 
 
 

Living people
1950 births
German footballers
Association football midfielders
Bundesliga players
La Liga players
Canadian Professional Soccer League (original) players
SV Werder Bremen players
TSV 1860 Munich players
Elche CF players
Calgary Mustangs (CPSL) players
Footballers from Munich
German expatriate footballers
German expatriate sportspeople in Spain
Expatriate footballers in Spain
German expatriate sportspeople in Switzerland
Expatriate footballers in Switzerland